The Radivoj Korać Cup MVP Award is an annual award bestowed to the player that is deemed to be the "Most Valuable Player" during the finals of the Radivoj Korać Cup. The Radivoj Korać Cup is the top-tier level national men's professional club basketball cup in Serbia. The award has existed and been awarded since 2003.

Winners

See also
List of Radivoj Korać Cup-winning head coaches
BLS First League MVP
BLS Super League MVP
BLS Playoff MVP

References

External links
 

European basketball awards
Basketball awards in Serbia
Basketball most valuable player awards
Radivoj Korać Cup